Ronald Jerome "Popeye" Jones (born June 17, 1970) is an American professional basketball coach and former player who serves as an assistant coach for the Denver Nuggets of the National Basketball Association (NBA).

College career
Born in Dresden, Tennessee, Jones played college basketball for Murray State University. He finished his college career as a three-time All-Ohio Valley Conference selection, a two-time honorable mention All-America and was named OVC Player of the Year in 1990 and 1991. Jones was honored as the OVC's Athlete of the Year in 1991 and 1992. He is one of only ten MSU men's basketball players to have his jersey retired; his #54 hangs in the rafters of the CFSB Center in Murray, Kentucky. Jones ranks fourth on Murray State's all-time scoring list with 2,057 points. He is also Murray State's all-time leader in rebounds with 1,374, and led the nation in that category in the 1990–91 season. He is the only player in Murray State history to record more than 2,000 points and 1,000 rebounds.

Playing career
After college, he was selected by the Houston Rockets in the second round (41st overall) of the 1992 NBA draft, but his rights were traded to the Dallas Mavericks for those of former University of Michigan center Eric Riley. After playing professionally in Europe for a season, he played for the Mavericks for three seasons until being traded to the Toronto Raptors for Riley's former Michigan Wolverines teammate, shooting guard Jimmy King. Jones also played with the Boston Celtics, Denver Nuggets, Washington Wizards and Golden State Warriors. He had a second stint with the Mavericks during the 2002–03 season, but played in only 26 of 82 games.

In a game on March 10, 1994, Jones collected 12 offensive rebounds without a single defensive rebound. The 12 offensive boards without recording a defensive rebound stands as an NBA record since at least 1983.

His best season was in 1995–96 with the Mavericks when he averaged 11.3 points and 10.8 rebounds per game while making 14 of 39 three-point attempts, after averaging 10.3 points and 10.6 rebounds the previous year. He holds NBA career per game averages of 7.0 points and 7.4 rebounds. He once secured 28 rebounds in a single game for the Mavericks in the 1995-96 season, still a team record.

Coaching career
Following his 11-year career year in the NBA, Jones decided to pursue coaching professional basketball. He first worked as a player development coach with the Dallas Mavericks. After spending the 2007–08 through the 2009–10 season with the Mavericks, he earned a coaching job with the New Jersey / Brooklyn Nets as an assistant coach.

On August 14, 2013, he was hired as an assistant coach for the Indiana Pacers. Jones worked with All-Stars like Roy Hibbert and Paul George, and reached the Eastern Conference Finals his first two years with the team.

On November 9, 2020, the Philadelphia 76ers hired Jones as an assistant coach under Doc Rivers.

On August 23, 2021, the Denver Nuggets announced that they had hired Jones as assistant coach.

Personal life
His nickname, Popeye, comes from the popular cartoon of that name.

Jones's sons, Seth and Caleb, are professional ice hockey players. During Jones's tenure with the Denver Nuggets, he approached Joe Sakic of the Colorado Avalanche about his son playing ice hockey. Sakic advised the elder Jones to enroll his sons in skating classes first.

Seth was drafted in the first round of the 2009 WHL Bantam Draft. He was taken 11th overall by the Everett Silvertips but later traded to the Portland Winterhawks. Seth was then taken with the fourth overall pick in the 2013 NHL Entry Draft by the Nashville Predators. In 2013, Seth played for the United States under-20 national team, which won gold at the 2013 IIHF World U20 Championship. Seth was traded to the Columbus Blue Jackets on January 6, 2016, serving as one of the team's alternate captains from 2018. On July 23, 2021, Seth was traded to the Chicago Blackhawks, joining his brother Caleb who had been traded to the Blackhawks earlier in the same month.

Jones's younger son Caleb was selected by the Edmonton Oilers as the 117th overall pick in the 2015 NHL Entry Draft. Caleb was a member of the United States under-20 national team, which won gold at the 2017 IIHF World U20 Championship. On July 12, 2021, Caleb was traded to the Chicago Blackhawks.

See also

 List of NCAA Division I men's basketball season rebounding leaders
 List of NCAA Division I men's basketball players with 2,000 points and 1,000 rebounds

References

External links

1970 births
Living people
African-American basketball players
American expatriate basketball people in Canada
American expatriate basketball people in Italy
American men's basketball players
Basketball coaches from Tennessee
Basketball players from Denver
Basketball players from Tennessee
Boston Celtics players
Brooklyn Nets assistant coaches
Dallas Mavericks assistant coaches
Dallas Mavericks players
Denver Nuggets assistant coaches
Denver Nuggets players
Golden State Warriors players
Houston Rockets draft picks
Indiana Pacers assistant coaches
Murray State Racers men's basketball players
New Jersey Nets assistant coaches
People from Dresden, Tennessee
Power forwards (basketball)
Sportspeople from Denver
Toronto Raptors players
Washington Wizards players